Tatahuicapan de Juárez or Tatahuicapan is a municipality located in the south-east of the state of Veracruz in Mexico. It was created in 1997 with an area of 208.06 km2.

Geography
The municipality of Tatahuicapan is delimited to the north, south and east by Mecayapan, and to the west by Soteapan. The rivers Tatahuicapán, Zapoapan, Piedra Labrada, Texizapan, and Temoloapan run through the region.

Climate
The weather in Tatahuicapan is typically warm all year round, with regular rains in summer and autumn.

Celebrations
A celebration takes place in March in honour of San Gabriel, patron saint of the town, and another in December in honour of the Virgen de Guadalupe.

References

External links 
 Tatahuicapan Tourist Guide
  Municipal Official Webpage
  Municipal Official Information

Municipalities of Veracruz
Los Tuxtlas